Herdman is an English surname. Notable people with the surname include:
Alexander Herdman (1869–1953), New Zealand politician
Bob Herdman (born 1966), American musician 
John Herdman (born 1975), English football manager
Joshua Herdman (born 1987), English actor
Martin Herdman (born 1956), English actor and rugby league player, father of Joshua Herdman
Priscilla Herdman, American folk singer
William Abbott Herdman (1858–1924), Scottish marine zoologist and oceanographer
William Gawin Herdman (1805–1882) English author and painter

English-language surnames